Aleksandr Yatskevich is the name of:
 Aleksandrs Jackevičs (born 1958), Soviet Latvian judoka
 Alyaksandr Yatskevich (born 1985), Belarusian footballer